The 2021 Faun-Ardèche Classic was the 21st edition of the Faun-Ardèche Classic cycle race. The category 1.Pro race was held on 27 February 2021 as a part of the 2021 UCI Europe Tour and the 2021 UCI ProSeries. The race started and finished in Guilherand-Granges, and featured five climbs, including a triple ascent of the short but steep Côte du Val d'Enfer, the last of which was in the final ten kilometers. It formed a pair of races on the same weekend with the 2021 Royal Bernard Drôme Classic, held on the following day, with both races being organized by Boucles Drôme Ardèche.

Teams 
Eleven of the nineteen UCI WorldTeams, seven UCI ProTeams, and three UCI Continental teams made up the twenty-one teams that participated in the race. All but two teams entered the maximum of seven riders;  entered six and  entered five, for a total of 144 riders, of which 122 finished. Many of these riders also contested the Royal Bernard Drôme Classic the following day.

UCI WorldTeams

 
 
 
 
 
 
 
 
 
 
 

UCI ProTeams

 
 
 
 
 
 
 

UCI Continental Teams

Result

References

External links 
 

Faun-Ardèche Classic
Faun-Ardèche Classic
Faun-Ardèche Classic
2021
Faun-Ardèche Classic